The Marriage of Doctor Danwitz is a 1956 West German drama film directed by Arthur Maria Rabenalt and starring Marianne Koch, Karlheinz Böhm and Heidemarie Hatheyer.

It was made at the Wandsbek Studios of the Hamburg-based Real Film. The film's art direction was by Dieter Bartels and Herbert Kirchhoff.

Cast

References

External links

1956 drama films
German drama films
West German films
Films directed by Arthur Maria Rabenalt
German black-and-white films
Real Film films
Films shot at Wandsbek Studios
1950s German films